Ameer Muhammad Akram Awan (31 December 1934 in Noorpur Sethi, British India – 7 December 2017 in Rawalpindi, Pakistan) was an Islamic scholar and spiritual leader of the Naqshbandia Owaisiah order of Sufism. He belonged to Awan tribe. As a mufassir, he authored four exegeses (tafsir) of the Qur'an, including Asrar at-Tanzeel. Awan was dean of the Siqarah Education System and patron of the magazine Al-Murshid and of the Al-Falah Foundation.

References

1934 births
2017 deaths
Pakistani Sufi religious leaders
Awan
People from Chakwal District